City of Ashes is the second installment in The Mortal Instruments series, an urban fantasy series set in New York written by Cassandra Clare. The novel was one of YALSA's top ten teen books for 2009.

Plot

Clary returns to the Institute after receiving a text message from Isabelle "Izzy" Lightwood, saying that Jace angered the Inquisitor, Imogen Herondale. He has been imprisoned in the Silent City and is awaiting trial by the Sword to determine if he is telling the truth about being in league with Valentine. The Sword is one of the Mortal Instruments indicated in the first book. Alongside the Sword is the Cup and the Mirror. While chained inside his cell, Jace hears something attacking the Silent Brothers. Valentine has killed the Silent Brothers to obtain the second Mortal Instrument - the Soul Sword. While the Cup is capable of creating new Shadowhunters, the Sword forces Shadowhunters to tell the truth. 

Clary, Izzy, and Alec respond to a distress call from the Silent City, only to discover that the current Silent Brothers inside have all been slain. Clary frees Jace using an amplified version of the opening rune that appeared to her amidst her panic. This is surprising because no new Runes have been created since the runes handed down by the Angel Raziel. The Inquisitor appears, along with a large group of armed Shadowhunters, and accuses Jace of helping Valentine, since he was supposed to go on trial by the Sword which is now gone. 

Magnus Bane is called to the scene by Alec, and offers to keep Jace as a prisoner in his apartment, while he and the others try to figure out Valentine's plans. Magnus and Alec have remained in contact since the first novel, and have even gone on a date. This is detailed in the Bane Chronicles, a tag-a-long book to the series. 

Jace soon receives a surprising offer from the Queen of the Seelie to visit her court. The Queen of the Seelie Court is a Downworlder, a fairy with demon heritage. Jace goes with Simon, Izzy and Clary. The group tries to convince the Queen to aid them in the defeat of Valentine. The Queen says she is not sure if she will help and also mentions how their court knows deep secrets, like how Jace and Clary are their father's "wonderful" experiments come to life. The group becomes confused and decides to leave. 

However, Clary is tricked into consuming faerie food, and is only able to leave by kissing "whom she most desires". Simon offers to kiss her, but the Queen tells him he is not the one "she desires most". This is hurtful because Clary has been attempting to date Simon since the beginning of the second book, in order to squash her feelings for Jace, her brother. However, Clary and Izzy suggest that the kiss might be from Jace. The three are reluctant at first because Clary is Jace's sister, but after Izzy insists that she too would kiss Alec to free him, Jace kisses Clary. The kiss suddenly becomes intense and passionate, and afterwards, Clary is free, proving that Jace's kiss is the one she most desires. This upsets Simon, and he storms off after they return to their realm. Jace and Clary confess their love to each other. Clary is torn between her love for Jace, and the taboo against it because they are blood relatives. Jace suggests keeping a secret relationship, to which Clary replies that it would eventually be discovered and that she is unwilling to lie to their friends and family.

Later, the vampire Raphael shows up at the Institute with Simon, who is on the verge of death.  The vampire explains that Simon's small initial intake of vampire blood as a rat made Simon believe he was turning into a vampire, and he went to the Hotel DuMort to see Raphael.  He then was devoured by vampires, mixing his blood with theirs.

Thus, as the only way left to save him, Simon is buried and transforms into a vampire, which causes a distraught Clary to ignore Jace as a result of her concern over Simon and his new undead status. While discussing how to potentially tell Simon's mother about his vampire transformation with Clary, Maia the werewolf comes into the house with wounds too severe for Luke to treat. Magnus heals Maia while Luke decides to check outside to see if the demons are still there. Luke is attacked and gets badly injured. Jace, Simon, and Clary battle the demons outside of the house. The demons flee after seeing Clary's rune on her forearm which she got during a dream of her mother blessing her.

They return to the house to rest with the others and end up talking about the remarkably powerful rune Clary used to free Jace earlier. Clary reveals that it was something she just thought of, and everyone opposes her, saying that nobody can simply make up a rune as they are created by angels. Clary is dared to make a new rune, and she ends up making a "Fearless" rune, as suggested by Jace. They try it on Alec, whose parents and sister arrive suddenly. Alec suddenly approaches his parents, saying he's seeing someone who is a Downworlder. Magnus magically silences him before he says who he is dating. Alec claims not to remember anything and suddenly gets nervous and defensive when asked who he is dating, leading them to believe that the rune actually worked. 

Everyone decides to sleep, but Jace secretly takes Raphael's motorcycle and meets Valentine at a ship. Valentine offers protection to his loved ones if Jace joins him and comes back to Idris with him. Jace is silent, but the next morning the Inquisitor claims that Jace was with Valentine and threatens to kill Jace if Valentine does not return the Mortal Sword. At Jace's denial, the Inquisitor once again imprisons Jace, planning to make a trade with Valentine - Jace's life for the Mortal Sword. Jace tries to tell her that it will not work, which the Inquisitor refuses to believe and she devises a plan of revenge on Valentine because he had killed her son, Stephen Herondale. 

While she is traveling to see Simon, Maia is attacked by a demon, who came to her in the form of her dead brother, after which Valentine kidnaps her.

Clary and the others discover Maia's kidnapping and rescue her with the help of Magnus, but not before Valentine drains Simon's blood. Jace manages to restore life to Simon by feeding him his blood, after which the Inquisitor appears. After seeing Jace's star-shaped scar on his shoulder, the Inquisitor begins to suggest something about who his parents are, but she jumps in front of Jace, saving him from a demon before she can finish. She later dies, leaving Jace confused at her sudden change of heart.

Meanwhile, one of Valentine's demons kidnap Clary and bring her to his boat where Valentine intimidates her with the Mortal Sword. Jace and Simon find and rescue her and Valentine admits that Jace only chose to fight on his side because he loves Clary more than a sister. He knew of this when Jace saw a demon that transforms into the thing you fear the most, which appeared to him in the form of Clary dying. The second time he saw the demon it appeared to him as Valentine, and Jace continued to kill the demon. Clary draws an opening rune on the ship's metal, which causes all of the ship's pieces to open up, making it explode. Clary falls in the river and is saved by the nixies the Seelie Queen sent to help. The group escapes by truck, where Simon discovers that Jace's blood has made him a "Daylighter", a vampire that can tolerate the sun's light. After a talk with Luke about love and his regrets of not telling Clary's mother how he felt about her, Clary finally decides to tell Jace of her love for him and her sudden change of mind to start a relationship, regardless of its consequences. However, before she can say anything, Jace tells her that he will only act as her brother from then on, breaking her heart. As Clary reels from this, she meets a woman who introduces herself as one of Jocelyn's friends and says that she knows how to wake up Clary's mother.

Cover and title
The cover features Clarissa Fray. The title refers to the City of Ashes, which is described in the chapter of the same name as the Silent City after Valentine and Agramon murder the Silent Brothers and steal the Mortal Sword.

Reception
The Duluth News Tribune praised City of Ashes, calling the book "gripping". The School Library Journal also praised the novel, comparing it to "like watching a particularly good vampire/werewolf movie". Kirkus Reviews enjoyed the book but warned that the "incestuous overtones might be too disturbing for some". Common Sense Media gave the book four stars, calling it "gripping" while warning parents of the violence and potential incest. Seventeen Magazine gave a positive review, saying that the book was "smart, funny, romantic".

Cancelled film adaptation

The film based on the second book titled The Mortal Instruments: City of Ashes was planned for production in 2014, but was cancelled.

References

External links

 The Official Mortal Instruments Website
 Cassandra Clare's Official Website

2008 American novels
American young adult novels
Contemporary fantasy novels
Novels set in New York City
Margaret K. McElderry books